Anaxarchus (c. 380 – c. 320 BC) was a Greek philosopher of the school of Democritus. Together with Pyrrho, he accompanied Alexander the Great into Asia. The reports of his philosophical views suggest that he was a forerunner of the Greek skeptics.

Life
Anaxarchus was born at Abdera in Thrace. He was the companion and friend of Alexander the Great in his Asiatic campaigns. According to Diogenes Laertius, in response to Alexander's claim to have been the son of Zeus-Ammon, Anaxarchus pointed to his bleeding wound and remarked, "See the blood of a mortal, not ichor, such as flows from the veins of the immortal gods."

Plutarch tells a story that at Bactra, in 327 BC in a debate with Callisthenes, he advised all to worship Alexander as a god even during his lifetime, is with greater probability attributed to the Sicilian Cleon.

When Alexander was trying to show that he is divine so that the Greeks and Macedonians would perform proskynesis to him, Anaxarchus said that Alexander could "more justly be considered a god than Dionysus or Heracles" (Arrian, 104)

Diogenes Laertius says that Nicocreon, the tyrant of Cyprus, commanded him to be pounded to death in a mortar, and that he endured this torture with fortitude and Cicero relates the same story.

Philosophy
Very little is known about his philosophical views. It is thought that he represents a link between the atomism of Democritus, and the skepticism of Pyrrho.

Anaxarchus is said to have studied under Diogenes of Smyrna, who in turn studied under Metrodorus of Chios, who used to declare that he knew nothing, not even the fact that he knew nothing. According to Sextus Empiricus, Anaxarchus "compared existing things to a scene-painting and supposed them to resemble the impressions experienced in sleep or madness." It was under the influence of Anaxarchus that Pyrrho is said to have adopted "a most noble philosophy, . . . taking the form of agnosticism and suspension of judgement." Anaxarchus is said to have praised Pyrrho's "indifference and sang-froid." Anaxarchus is said to have possessed "fortitude and contentment in life," which earned him the epithet eudaimonikos ("fortunate"), which may imply that he held the end of life to be eudaimonia.

Plutarch reports that he told Alexander the Great that there was an infinite number of worlds, causing the latter to become dejected because he had not yet conquered even one.

References

External links

4th-century BC Greek people
4th-century BC philosophers
Abderites
Ancient Greek atomist philosophers
Ancient Thracian Greeks
Hellenistic-era philosophers
Philosophers and tutors of Alexander the Great
Ancient Skeptic philosophers